Jon Beck Shank (1919-1977) was a Mormon poet and a high school English teacher in New York City.  Shank studied at Brigham Young University.  While at BYU Shank collaborated with Davis Bitton on a theatrical production.

Shank was a native of Pennsylvania and a convert to the Church of Jesus Christ of Latter-day Saints. Shank died in 1977.

In 1945 Shank had a collection of his poems published by Alfred A. Knopf.  He later taught high school English in New York City, among his students was Roger Rosenblatt, who later wrote an essay praising Mormon artists in which he admitted that this view was largely a result of his association with Shank.

Another of Shank's students was Anne Waldman who has mentioned him being a scholar of the works of Wallace Stevens.

References

Sources
Poetry, Vol. 66, no. 4 July 1945

External links
 
 Davis Bitton. "Images of Faith: Art of the Latter-day Saints". in BYU Studies, Vol. 36, no. 3
 Open Library listing for Shank

Latter Day Saints from Pennsylvania
American male poets
Brigham Young University alumni
Converts to Mormonism
1919 births
1977 deaths
Latter Day Saints from New York (state)